The Lokmanya Tilak Terminus - Bhubaneswar Superfast Express is a Superfast train belonging to East Coast Railway zone that runs between Lokmanya Tilak Terminus and Bhubaneswar in India. It is currently being operated with 12879/12880 train numbers on bi-weekly basis.

Service

The 12879/Lokmanya Tilak Terminus  - Bhubaneswar SF Express has an average speed of 58 km/hr and covers 1790 km in 31h. The 12880/Bhubaneswar - Lokmanya Tilak Terminus  SF Express has an average speed of 59 km/hr and covers 1790 km in 30h 25m.

Route and halts 

The halts of the train are:

Coach composite

The train has Modern LHB rakes with max speed of 110 kmph. The train consists of 22 coaches :

 1 AC II Tier
 4 AC III Tier
 11 Sleeper Coaches
 1 Pantry Car
 3 General Unreserved
 2 EOG

Traction

Both trains are hauled by an Electric Loco Shed, Vadodara based WAP-4E or Bhilai Loco Shed based WAP-7 electric locomotive from Lokmanya Tilak Terminus to Bhubaneswar.

Rake Sharing 

The train shares its rake with 12819/12820 Odisha Sampark Kranti Express and 22879/22880 Bhubaneswar - Tirupati Superfast Express.

Direction Reversal

Train Reverses its direction 2 times:

  (Will be discontinued w.e.f. 15 October 2019)

Notes

See also 

 Bhubaneswar railway station
 Lokmanya Tilak Terminus railway station
 Odisha Sampark Kranti Express
 Bhubaneswar - Tirupati Superfast Express

References

External links 

 12879/Mumbai LTT - Bhubaneswar SF Express
 12880/Bhubaneswar - Mumbai LTT SF Express

Transport in Mumbai
Transport in Bhubaneswar
Express trains in India
Rail transport in Chhattisgarh
Rail transport in Maharashtra
Rail transport in Odisha
Railway services introduced in 2009
2009 establishments in India